(1526–1563) was the son of Tani Sobuko. Sōyō was known as one of the most talented renga composers of his era. Being mainly known at being a rival of the famed composer, Satomura Joha, who was the leading master of the linked verse after Sōyō's death.

1526 births
1563 deaths
Japanese writers of the Muromachi period
16th-century Japanese poets